A baker's dozen is 13 items, rather than the 12 items in a standard dozen.

Baker's Dozen may also refer to:

Film and television
Baker's Dozen (TV series), a 1982 American sitcom
"Baker's Dozen" (Orange Is the New Black), a 2019 TV episode
Baker's Dozen, a 2021 Hulu original program
Baker's Dozen, a film by Margy Kinmonth

Music
Baker's Dozen, a 1950s jazz group led by Kenny Baker
Baker's Dozen, a 1995 album by Enda Kenny
"The Baker's Dozen" (concert series), a 2017 concert series by Phish

Other uses
Baker's Dozen (solitaire), a card game
Baker's Dozen Donuts, a Canadian donut store chain
The Baker's Dozen, a poetry collection by George Edward Tait